Micropisthodon is a monotypic genus created for the poorly-known rear-fanged snake species, Micropisthodon ochraceus, found in eastern Madagascar. No subspecies are currently recognized.

Description
Back is brownish, with alternating dark and light areas, and the dark areas sometimes forming chevrons. Dentition is apparently aglyphous. Pupils are circular.

The species is oviparous. One dissected female contained 10 small eggs.

Habitat and conservation
It is arboreal.

It is a locally common species, but the population is probably declining because of habitat loss and degradation caused by open cast mining, conversion of land for agriculture, and logging. It occurs in several protected areas.

References

Pseudoxyrhophiidae
Monotypic snake genera
Snakes of Africa
Reptiles of Madagascar
Endemic fauna of Madagascar
Taxa named by François Mocquard
Reptiles described in 1894